Horologica barrieria is a species of sea snail, a gastropod in the family Cerithiopsidae. It was described by Nützel, in 1998.

References

Cerithiopsidae
Gastropods described in 1998